Sphaeromorda atterrima is a species of beetle in the genus Sphaeromorda of the family Mordellidae, which is part of the superfamily Tenebrionoidea. It was described in 1954 by Ermisch.

References

Beetles described in 1954
Mordellidae